The 3rd Armoured Division is a formation of the Syrian Army responsible for securing the northern approach to Damascus. The division is based in a military complex near Qutayfah and has traditionally been seen as one of the Assad Government's most reliable conventional Divisions.

Structure
The division is part of the Syrian Army's 3rd Corps, and is composed of 47th Armoured Brigade, the 65th Armoured Brigade, the 81st Armoured Brigade, the 21st Mechanized Brigade, and an unknown Artillery Regiment.

As of 2011 the division was under the command of Maj. Gen. Naim Jasem Suleiman. The 65th Brigade was under the command of Brig. Gen. Jihad Mohamed Sultan.

History

Islamic Uprising in Syria
The division, under General Shafiq Fayadh, played a key role in defeating the Muslim Brotherhood uprising in the 1980s. During the conflict the entire Division was deployed to Aleppo in March 1980, and garrisoned the city for an entire year. Patrick Seale wrote on how the division had "a tank in almost every street.” Seale also wrote of an incident where General Fayadh stood on the turret of a tank and proclaimed that “he was prepared to kill a thousand men a day to rid the city of the vermin of the Muslim Brothers.”

The division was also used in the Government assault on Hama, with the division's 47th Armoured and 21st Mechanized Brigades providing the backbone of the assault.

Muslim Brotherhood reports following the uprising suggested that three quarters of the officers, and a third of the soldiers of these brigades were Alawites.

1984 coup attempt
The division, under Fayadh, also played a key role in blocking an attempted coup in 1984 by Rifaat al-Assad. The 3rd Division, along with Ali Haydar's Special Forces and the Republican Guard, engaged with Rifaat's Defence Companies in Damascus. While the Special Forces deployed anti-Tank platoons on the streets of Damascus to confront Rifaat's armoured columns and surrounded Rifaat's bases with snipers, Fayadh's armoured forces provided the armoured back-up and firepower to completely insulate Damascus from the outside, so that Defense Company units outside of Damascus ( in Lebanon and further north) could not come inside Damascus, and the 30,000 or so of Rifaat's forces within the environs of Damascus were effectively trapped.

Role in the civil war

Human Rights Watch accused the division of involvement in the suppression of protests at the beginning of the Syrian Civil War. Specifically, the division was alleged to have been involved in the violent suppression of protests in Douma and Daraa in April 2011. In Douma, the division was allegedly involved in arbitrary arrests, the looting of homes, and the shooting of unarmed protesters.

The division has since been involved in the Rif Dimashq Governorate campaign.

References 

Armoured divisions of Syria
Military units and formations established in 1971
Armoured Division 3